The 2022 season was Viking's 4th consecutive year in the Eliteserien, and their 72nd season in the top flight of Norwegian football. The club participated in the Eliteserien, the 2021–22 Norwegian Football Cup, the 2022–23 Norwegian Football Cup and the UEFA Europa Conference League. It was the club's second season with Bjarte Lunde Aarsheim and Morten Jensen as managers.

Squad

Out on loan

Transfers

Transfers in

Transfers out

Loans in

Loans out

Friendlies

Pre-season
The following friendly matches were played in pre-season.

Competitions

Eliteserien

Table

Results summary

Results by round

Matches
The Eliteserien fixtures were announced on 14 January 2022. Round 16, 18 and 19 were moved from their original dates.

Norwegian Cup

2021–22

2022–23

The pair-ups for the first round were announced on 7 April 2022. The pair-ups for the second round were announced on 23 May 2022. The draw for the third round was made on 23 June 2022. The match between Viking and Kristiansund was originally scheduled for 29 June, but it was postponed due to flight cancellations caused by an airline strike.

UEFA Europa Conference League

Qualifying phase and play-off round

Second qualifying round
The draw for the second qualifying round was made on 15 June 2022.

Third qualifying round

Play-off round

Squad statistics

Appearances and goals

|-
|colspan="14"|Players who left Viking during the season:

|}

References

Viking FK seasons
Viking
Viking